Little Wills may refer to:

Little Wills Creek, a creek in Pennsylvania
Little Wills Valley, a valley in Alabama